KBES (89.5 FM) is an Assyrian radio station broadcasting a world ethnic format. Licensed to Ceres, California, United States, the station serves the Central Valley area.  The station is currently owned by Bet Nahrain, Inc.

References

External links

BES
Mass media in Stanislaus County, California
Mass media in Tuolumne County, California
Ceres, California
Assyrian-American culture in California